The following are the national records in athletics in Lithuania maintained by Lithuanian national athletics federation: Lietuvos Lengvosios Atletikos Federacija (LLAF).

Outdoor

Key to tables:

+ = en route to a longer distance

h = hand timing

OT = oversized track (> 200m in circumference)

Men

Women

Indoor

Men

Women

See also
List of Baltic records in athletics
List of Lithuanian records

References
General
Lithuanian Athletics Records 5 February 2023 updated
Specific

External links
LLAF web site

Lithuania
Records
Athletics
Athletics